Astra 1G is one of the Astra communications satellites owned and operated by SES.

History 
SES ordered its Hughes 601HP satellite, in 1994 for Astra 1G.

Launch 
Astra-1G was launched on 2 December 1997 at 23:10:37 UTC, by a Proton-K / DM-2M launch vehicle, from Site 81/23 at the Baikonur Cosmodrome in Kazakhstan. It was maneuvered into a geostationary orbit and at 19.2° East of longitude.

See also 

 SES (satellite operator)
 Astra (satellite family)

References 

Astra satellites
Satellites of Luxembourg
Spacecraft launched in 1997
1997 in spaceflight
1997 in Luxembourg
Satellites using the BSS-601 bus